The S&P SL20, or the Standard & Poor's Sri Lanka 20, is a stock market index, based on market capitalization, that follows the performance of 20 leading publicly traded companies listed in the Colombo Stock Exchange. The 20 companies that make up the index is determined by Standard & Poor's global index methodology, according to which the index's listing is reviewed each year. All S&P SL20 listed stocks are classified according to S&P and MSCI's Global Industry Classification Standard, thereby enabling better comparison of performance of Sri Lanka's largest and most liquid stocks with other global indices.

History

With the conclusion of the thirty year conflict in 2009, Sri Lanka's Colombo Stock Exchange experienced unprecedented investor interest, with Bloomberg ranking Colombo Stock Exchange the best performing stock exchange for the year 2010. However, by June 2012, the investor confidence had eroded and an analysis of 78 stock exchanges conducted by Bespoke Investment Group identified Colombo Stock Exchange as the world’s fourth worst performing stock exchange to date during that year.

In identifying that the loss of confidence may be in part due to the inherent weaknesses in the Colombo Stock Exchange's indices, CSE partnered with Standard & Poor to develop S&P SL20 Index, as an equity benchmark, set according to global standards, that will help investors gauge the performance of the Sri Lankan equity market. The S&P SL20 Index was initiated on 18 June 2012 and was launched in Colombo on 26 June 2012. Further to the introduction of S&P SL20, on 1 January 2013, Milanka Price Index, which had till then tracked the performance of 25 best performing stocks in Sri Lanka, was discontinued.

In June 2013, Colombo Stock Exchange, in an attempt to further bridge the information asymmetry between investors and listed companies, partnered with Amba Research Lanka, to provide equities research on companies included in the S&P SL20 Index.

List of Companies in the Current Index

This list is complete and up-to-date as of December 17, 2022

References 

Asian stock market indices
Companies of Sri Lanka
Finance in Sri Lanka